Mary L. Bell (1901-1995) was the first African-American to own and operate a radio station in the city of Detroit, Michigan as president and chairperson of Bell Broadcasting Corporation.

Personal life 
Bell was born in Nashville, Tennessee and graduated from Walden University (Tennessee). She married Haley Bell, and they had two daughters.

Career 
Haley Bell founded Bell Broadcasting Corporation in 1956. Following Haley's death, Mary succeeded him as president and chairperson of the board. She retired in 1992. Bell was the parent company of the Detroit radio stations WJZZ-FM and WCHB-AM, among the first African-American owned and operated radio stations in the U.S.

Bell was active in a variety of organizations, including the National Council of Negro Women, the NAACP, and the YMCA.

Death 
Bell died of natural causes on March 25, 1995 in Detroit, Michigan.

References 

1901 births
1995 deaths
Businesspeople from Detroit
20th-century African-American women
20th-century African-American people
African-American business executives
20th-century American businesspeople